Atomic Betty (retitled Atomic Betty: Mission Earth for its third and final season) is a Flash animated television series produced by Atomic Cartoons, Breakthrough Entertainment and Tele Images Kids, along with the Marathon Group joining for the third season. Additional funding for production is provided by Teletoon in Canada, Phil Roman Entertainment (uncredited) in the U.S. and M6 (seasons 1-2) and Télétoon (season 3) in France.

In Canada, the show originally aired from August 29, 2004, until January 29, 2008 on Teletoon, lasting for three years. In France, the series aired on M6 from 2004 until 2005 and then on Télétoon+ from 2006 until 2008. In the U.S, the series aired on Cartoon Network on September 17, 2004, until May 22, 2005 and The Hub (now known as "Discovery Family") from 2010 until 2011, along with its third and final season.

Synopsis
Betty Barrett is a typical 12-year-old girl who enjoys school, daydreaming about living in outer space, sci-fi movies, and singing in her musical band, living in Moose Jaw Heights (a fictional suburb of Moose Jaw, Saskatchewan). Unknown to all of her friends and family, however, she is also a member of the Galactic Guardians, an elite team dedicated to interstellar crime-fighting and law enforcement. As "Atomic Betty", assisted by her two allies; the alien pilot Sparky and a robot named X-5, she confronts the evil overlord Maximus I.Q. and his servant Minimus, as well as other intergalactic supervillains, criminals, terrorists, and gangsters. Despite being rather unassuming on Earth, Atomic Betty is a superstar throughout the galaxy and even has a crowd of people who consider her their role model.

In each episode, a crisis occurs somewhere in the galaxy, usually while Betty enjoys some tasks with her friends. Invariably, her bracelet starts beeping, and she runs off alone to save the galaxy in her nice pastel pink-and-white superpowered Galactic Guardian battle suit, which allows her a wide variety of weapons, gadgets, and supernatural abilities, such as flying. Accompanied by her crew, Betty takes over to fight the villains before returning home and mentioning her absence.

The show includes frequent references to other well-known works of pop culture, especially sci-fi, such as Star Wars, The Matrix and Transformers.

Episodes

Characters

Production
Atomic Cartoons, based in Vancouver, British Columbia, wrote the scripts and produced the animation for the show using Adobe Flash. Tele Images Kids produced animation and voice direction for the French-language version of the show. Breakthrough Films & Television, through its distribution subsidiary, handled worldwide distribution outside of Canada, except Spain and Portugal.

Three seasons of the show were produced, totaling 78 half-hour or 156 quarter-hour episodes, depending on the format shown in each market. There is also a one-hour Christmas special titled Atomic Betty: The No-L 9.

Cancelled sequel
In 2010, Atomic Cartoons announced a sequel series was planned for a production titled Atomic Betty Redux. The show would have featured the 17-year-old Atomic Betty; her teenage future self that first introduced in the two-part finale "The Future Is Now!".

It was slated to be released either in late 2013 or mid-2014 but entered development hell shortly after. In early 2019, a Reddit user emailed Atomic Cartoons regarding the show and the response was that the planned series had been cancelled due to the animation studio's desire to focus on their new projects.

Telecast and home media
Atomic Betty premiered on Teletoon in Canada on August 29, 2004. The series was formerly aired on Cartoon Network from September 17, 2004 until May 22, 2005, in the U.S. and The Hub (now known as "Discovery Family") from October 10, 2010 until October 12, 2011. It aired on CITV in the United Kingdom on March 11, 2006. The show was also formerly aired on Starz Kids and Family. However, fans were disappointed in it because it was only at its first season; the final two were too expensive for the Starz brand to acquire. So, due to this, it was later removed from the lineup on weekday mornings. Recently, Kartoon Channel, a web-based cartoon streaming channel, is now airing all three seasons of the show. It also aired repeats in Canada on Cartoon Network until 2015 and BBC Kids until the channel was closed in 2018.

Warner Home Video (sister company to the show's American broadcaster Cartoon Network) released two DVD volumes of the show on October 18, 2005, in Region 1 and February 6, 2006, in Japan. Each release contained eight segment-episodes from the first season. The other two volumes Betty Powers Up! and Betty Blasts Off! were planned but cancelled.

Merchandise

Soundtrack

Atomic Betty is the official soundtrack to the television series of the same name. It was released by Koch Records (now eOne Music) on November 8, 2005, and contains some tracks performed by the title character of the show, Betty Barrett, voiced by actress/singer Tajja Isen. She wrote and recorded that album in 2004. As of 2017, the album is still available on iTunes and Amazon.

Video game
A video game based on the show developed by Big Blue Bubble was released for the Game Boy Advance in Europe on August 25, 2005, and in North America on October 25, 2005.

Dolls and action figures
 
Hong Kong-based toy company Playmates Toys was chosen during the initial run of the Atomic Betty TV show in Canada to produce a coinciding toy line. The toy line included a variety of Betty Barrett character dolls (made of rubber, cloth, nylon and silicone), which featured both her iconic pink-and-white dress, and her normal outfit, along with a yellow sweater and green skirt. The dolls featured nylon hair that could be brushed and styled, similar to popular fashion dolls at the time such as Mattel's Barbie and Bratz. A "Talking Betty Doll" was released in 2004, which would say the character's catchphrase "Atomic Betty, reporting for duty!" when a button on its stomach was pressed. The doll was powered by AAA batteries and featured the same nylon hair as the smaller versions of the doll had. Other toys by Playmates included small plastic figurines of major supporting characters, and a large plastic "Transforming Star Cruiser" that certain Betty dolls could fit into and ride in. Outside of Canada, UK-based toy company Character produced a line of Betty Barrett dolls for British audiences, releasing a television commercial on CITV to advertise the dolls in 2005. Character's doll line was very similar to the Playmates doll line, but Character only made dolls of Betty, not any supporting characters. Accessories included a plastic playhouse, which was styled in a similar fashion to the house that Betty lived in on the series.

References

External links

 

 
2000s Canadian animated television series
2000s French animated television series
2004 Canadian television series debuts
2004 French television series debuts
2008 Canadian television series endings
2008 French television series endings
Animated television series about children
Animated television series about extraterrestrial life
Anime-influenced Western animated television series
Canadian Screen Award-winning television shows
Canadian children's animated action television series
Canadian children's animated comic science fiction television series
Canadian children's animated science fantasy television series
Canadian children's animated space adventure television series
Canadian flash animated television series
Cartoon Network original programming
English-language television shows
Fictional characters who use magic
French children's animated action television series
French children's animated comic science fiction television series
French children's animated science fantasy television series
French children's animated space adventure television series
French flash animated television series
French-language television shows
M6 (TV channel) original programming
Teletoon original programming
Television series by 9 Story Media Group
Television series by Banijay
Television series by Film Roman
Television shows set in Saskatchewan